Mlice-Kostery  is a village in the administrative district of Gmina Drobin, within Płock County, Masovian Voivodeship, in east-central Poland.

The village has a population of 80.

References

Mlice-Kostery